Tezel (literally "swift-handed") is a Turkish surname formed by the combination of the Turkish words tez ("quick, prompt, nimble") and el ("hand") and may refer to:
 Aylin Tezel (born 1983), German actress 
 Ayşe Tezel (born 1980), Turkish British actress
 Tunç Tezel (born 1977), Turkish amateur astronomer and photographer

See also 

 Tetzel

References

Turkish-language surnames